I Ain't from Chicago is an album by blues musician Jimmy Reed released by the BluesWay label in 1973.

Track listing
All compositions credited to Jimmy Reed except where noted
 "World's Got a Problem" (Al Smith) − 3:10
 "I Don't Know (Part 1)" (Al Smith, Jimmy Reed, Mary Lee Reed) − 2:30
 "I Don't Know (Part 2)" (Smith, Reed, Reed) − 1:55
 "Got to Be a Reason" − 2:55
 "Take Out Some Insurance" − 2:31
 "I Don't Believe in Nothing" (D. Sanders) − 3:00
 "If You Want It Done Right" (Johnnie Mae Dunson) − 2:57
 "Life Won't Last Me Long" (Dunson) − 2:30
 "Turn Me On" (Sanders) − 3:30
 "Got Me Worried" (Sanders) − 3:30
 "I Ain't from Chicago" (Reed, Smith) − 3:15

Personnel
Jimmy Reed – guitar, vocals, harmonica
Unidentified musicians – guitar, bass, drums

References

Jimmy Reed albums
1973 albums
BluesWay Records albums